George Kirwan (1830 – 23 July 1899) was an English cricketer.  Kirwan's batting style is unknown.

Kirwan made his first-class debut for England against the Marylebone Cricket Club in July 1853 at Lord's.  In England's first-innings he was run out for a single run, while in their second-innings he was dismissed for 3 runs by William Hillyer.  The Marylebone Cricket Club won by 80 runs.  He made his only first-class appearance for Sussex in September 1853 against Nottinghamshire at the Royal Brunswick Ground, Hove.  In Sussex's first-innings, Kirwan scored 11 runs before being dismissed by William Clarke, while in their second-innings he was dismissed for 6 runs by James Grundy.  Nottinghamshire won the match by an innings and 8 runs.  He made his final first-class appearance in September 1853 for the Gentlemen of England against a United England Eleven at the Royal Brunswick Ground.  In the Gentlemen's first-innings, Kirwan scored 4 runs before being dismissed by John Hyde, while in their second-innings he finished not out on 18.  The United England Eleven won the match by 7 wickets.

He died on 23 July 1899 at Bedford, Bedfordshire.

References

External links
George Kirwan at ESPNcricinfo
George Kirwan at CricketArchive

1830 births
1899 deaths
English cricketers
Sussex cricketers
Non-international England cricketers
Gentlemen of England cricketers